Nikolaevo is a small town in Stara Zagora Province, South-central Bulgaria. It is the administrative centre of the homonymous Nikolaevo Municipality. As of December 2009, the town has a population of 2,872 inhabitants.

References 

Populated places in Stara Zagora Province
Towns in Bulgaria